Coleonyx gypsicolus, sometimes called the Isla San Marcos barefoot banded gecko is a gecko endemic to Isla San Marcos in Mexico. It is sometimes considered a subspecies of Switak's banded gecko.

References

Coleonyx
Reptiles of Mexico
Reptiles described in 1988